Holly Luong Ham is an American business executive and former Washington, D.C., government official. She served as a senior official in the U.S. Department of Housing and Urban Development and in the U.S. Department of Commerce Minority Business Development Agency (MBDA). Ham also served as the executive director of the White House Initiative on Asian Americans and Pacific Islanders in the U.S. Department of Education.  Prior to that, Ham served as the Assistant Secretary for Management in the U.S. Department of Education, where she was appointed by President Trump on April 20, 2017.

Early life and education
Ham was born in Saigon, Vietnam, to Chinese parents. After the end of the Vietnam War, her parents took their five children and fled in the summer of 1979. In January 1980, at the age of 7, Ham and her family settled in Texas as refugees. Ham attended elementary and secondary public schools in Texas. She graduated from the University of Houston, where she received both her Bachelor and Master of Business Administration degrees and was a member of business honor society Beta Gamma Sigma.

Career

Early and mid-career

Ham initiated her technology-focused career in 1994 in Finland as a software engineer and systems analyst. She spent over 18 years with Hewlett Packard Enterprise.

Ham's work in the private sector has included enterprise data management, security, resource planning initiatives and enhancements as well as application modernization and cloud initiatives to support business growth and development. She joined Precise Software Solutions, Inc. as its new Chief Growth Officer in March 2021.

Government career
On April 20, 2017, President Trump announced Ham's appointment as Assistant Secretary for Management in the U.S. Department of Education. The post did not require Senate confirmation. Ham was responsible for overseeing human capital management, security, logistics, facilities, student privacy compliance, EEO services and records management.

On November 13, 2017, Ham was appointed executive director of the White House Initiative on Asian Americans and Pacific Islanders (AAPIs) in the U.S. Department of Education. In this role, Ham advocated for better access and resources for nearly 22 million AAPIs across the United States and its territories.

 On August 20, 2018, Ham spoke alongside First Lady Melania Trump and federal colleagues at the Federal Partners in Bullying Prevention Summit on Cyberbullying, hosted at the U.S. Department of Health and Human Services.

Ham served as Director of Special Projects in the U.S. Department of Housing and Urban Development and her work centered on optimizing departmental procedures and improving delivery of service.

In her role as Senior Advisor in the U.S. Department of Commerce MBDA, Ham connected the agency with a virtual business center to provide resources in support of minority business enterprises.

References 

Living people
People from Ho Chi Minh City
United States Department of Education officials
Trump administration personnel
University of Houston alumni
1972 births
Asian conservatism in the United States